Idrettsparken (also known as Tinfos Arena until 13 September 2008 for sponsorship reasons) is a football stadium located in Notodden, Norway. The stadium is the home ground of Norwegian second tier club Notodden FK and has a current capacity of 2,723.

The record attendance of 2,723 was set on 13 September 2008 in a 1. divisjon game against Odd Grenland.

References

External links
 Notodden Idrettspark - Nordic Stadiums

Football venues in Norway
Notodden FK
Notodden